Oenomaus atena is a species of butterfly of the family Lycaenidae. It is widely distributed in lowland in Costa Rica, Panama, western Ecuador, French Guiana, Venezuela, Peru and Brazil. Most species with an atena-like ventral wing pattern have historically been identified as O. atena, which means that virtually all literature records for this species from before 2005 are unreliable.

References

Butterflies described in 1867
Eumaeini
Lycaenidae of South America
Taxa named by William Chapman Hewitson